The herbaceous perennial plant Gentiana calycosa is a species of gentian known by the common names Rainier pleated gentian and mountain bog gentian.

Description
The plant has hardy, thick green leaves on the thin red stems from which the flowers are borne.

Distribution and habitat
It is native to the mid-elevation mountains of the western United States and Canada from the Sierra Nevada of California to the Canadian Cascades. It grows in wet meadows and around seeps.

Cultivation
Like other gentians, G. calycosa is an attractive mountain wildflower good for use in alpine gardens, but it may be difficult to grow, preferring rocky soils that are moist.

References

External links

Jepson Manual Treatment
Photo gallery

calycosa
Flora of the West Coast of the United States
Flora of Western Canada
Flora of California
Flora of the Cascade Range
Flora of the Klamath Mountains
Flora of the Sierra Nevada (United States)
Flora without expected TNC conservation status